Poitrenaud is a French surname. Notable people with the surname include:

Clément Poitrenaud (born 1982), French rugby union player
Jacques Poitrenaud (1922–2005), French film director and actor

French-language surnames